Calvary Chapel Costa Mesa is a Christian megachurch located near the boundary between the cities of Costa Mesa and Santa Ana in Orange County. Although the church takes its name from its original facilities on the Costa Mesa side of the boundary, it is now in Santa Ana. It is the original Calvary Chapel, having grown since 1965 from a handful of people led by the original senior pastor Chuck Smith to become the "mother church" of over one thousand congregations worldwide. Outreach Magazine's list of the 100 Largest Churches in America lists attendance as 9,500, making it the thirty-ninth largest in America.

History

Chuck Smith started pastoring at Calvary Chapel in 1965 with a congregation of only twenty-five. Smith's style was to preach straight from the Bible, mostly without deviation. In 1968 Smith, who was looking for a way to bring Christ to the current generation of hippies and surfers, invited Lonnie and Connie Frisbee to work alongside John Nicholson and John Higgins to work with the hippies in the area at "The House of Miracles". Within a week it had 35 new converts.
Lonnie's charismatic, Pentecostal style caused some disagreement within the church, since he seemed more intent on gaining converts and experiencing the presence of the Holy Spirit than on teaching newer converts Biblical doctrine. 
Lonnie Frisbee's experiential charismatic approach was a key element in the foundation in Southern California of what was later termed the Jesus movement in the early part of the 1970s. Subsequent to Frisbee's arrival, Calvary Chapel claimed thousands of converts and newly baptized joined the movement which later spread throughout the United States and the rest of the world.

As of 2009, there are more than 1500 Calvary Chapel congregations worldwide. Smith has started other ministries including Maranatha! Music, a record label, and The Word for Today, a publishing/radio broadcasting ministry. On October 3, 2013, Smith died after a long battle with lung cancer. Smith remained as the senior pastor at Calvary Chapel Costa Mesa during his battle with cancer - including preaching at three services the Sunday before his death.

Brian Brodersen, Smith's son-in-law, became senior pastor following his death.

Controversy
Some Christian media have detailed a variety of allegations involving Smith and the leadership of Calvary Chapel Costa Mesa. These include financial improprieties and lax standards for sexual improprieties.

A lawsuit was filed alleging that Smith and others at Calvary Chapel Costa Mesa knew or should have known that a minister named Anthony Iglesias was prone to committing sexual abuse when they moved him from ministry positions in Diamond Bar, California, to Thailand, to Post Falls, Idaho.  Iglesias was convicted of lewd conduct with two 14-year-old boys in California in 2004, and the lawsuit stemmed from events in Idaho, but all alleged abuse occurred in or before 2003.  The Costa Mesa congregation is involved solely due to its leadership role among Calvary Chapels.

References

External links
 

Evangelical megachurches in the United States
Megachurches in California
Evangelical churches in California
Churches in Orange County, California
Costa Mesa, California
Santa Ana, California
Culture of Santa Ana, California
Organizations based in Santa Ana, California
Christian organizations established in 1965
Radio broadcasting companies of the United States
Costa Mesa